The ENSTA Paris, officially École nationale supérieure de techniques avancées is a prestigious French graduate school of engineering ("école d'ingénieurs"). Founded in 1741, it is the oldest "grande école" in France. It is located in Palaiseau in the south of Paris, on the Paris-Saclay campus, and is a constituent faculty of the Polytechnic Institute of Paris. In 2021, 180 engineers graduated from the school.

ENSTA Paris affords its students a general training course in engineering. To this end, the school provides high-level scientific and technological training. The teaching is given by research professors with the participation of numerous auxiliary teachers from the economic and industrial world familiar with the latest technical developments in a wide variety of fields. The general nature of the training on offer enables ENSTA graduates to find a career in various sectors such as the automotive or naval industry, networks and telecommunications, space propulsion, robotics, oceanology and the environment.

Research, one of the school's primary missions, makes a significant contribution to both fundamental and applied fields, meeting the needs of businesses and also contributing to the school's scholarly outlook. Roughly half of the research at the school is the responsibility of the school's research professors, and the other half is carried out by researchers from the CNRS, the INSERM, and the École polytechnique working at ENSTA premises.

History 
Originally, the school was the brainchild of Henri-Louis Duhamel du Monceau, inspector general of the Navy. He had identified the need to give the Navy's master carpenters a theoretical education, particularly in mathematics and physics, which were making quick progress, so that they would have a clearer understanding of their trade.

Duhamel du Monceau founded the first school in his home in Paris on the Isle Saint Louis in 1741. This date is recognised as the origin of the institution. In 1748 it was moved to the royal library on rue Richelieu, and in 1753 to the Louvre Palace, immediately adjacent to the Académie des Sciences.  It was closed in 1759 during the Seven Years' War.  In 1765, he managed to persuade the duc de Choiseul to reopen it as part of a sweeping overhaul of the navy.  Duhamel du Monceau continued to run the school for the rest of his life.

The School of Student Engineer Constructors, as it was known, was closed in 1793 during the French Revolution.  It reopened in 1795 as an application school for the Ecole Polytechnique. Later on, it became known as Ecole nationale supérieure du Génie maritime (National Higher College of Maritime Engineering).

In 1970, the Délégation générale pour l'Armement (Arms administration of the Ministry of Defence) merged the school with three of its other establishments:

- the École nationale supérieure des Poudres (Powders and explosives institute)

- the École nationale supérieure de l'Armement (Arms engineering institute)

- the École des Ingénieurs hydrographes de la Marine (Hydrographic institute).

This formed the École nationale supérieure de Techniques avancées (ENSTA), the role of which is to train engineers in the naval, mechanical, nuclear, chemical, electronic and related fields. The scientific skills of each of the founding institutes survives in the broad range of research disciplines covered at ENSTA, as well as in the more general nature of its teaching and the variety of specialities offered to the students.

Today, ENSTA's legal status is that of a "public administrative establishment", placed under the supervision of the Ministry of Defence. It is headed by a general officer of the Corps of Ordnance Ingineers (DGA). Some former graduates of École polytechnique attend ENSTA before joining the military Corps of Ordnance Engineers, which staffs the DGA.

Rankings

National ranking (ranked as ENSTA Paris for its Master of Sciences in Engineering)

International ranking (ranked as Institut Polytechnique de Paris)

Academics
ENSTA Paris is a Grande École, a French institution of higher education that is separate from, but parallel and connected to the main framework of the French public university system. Similar to the Ivy League in the United States, Oxbridge in the UK, and C9 League in China, Grandes Écoles are elite academic institutions that admit students through an extremely competitive process. Grandes Écoles typically they have much smaller class sizes and student bodies than public universities in France, and many of their programs are taught in English. While most Grandes Écoles are more expensive than French universities, ENSTA Paris charges the same tuition fees: €243 annually for the Master’s degree in 2021/2022 International internships, study abroad opportunities, and close ties with government and the corporate world are a hallmark of the Grandes Écoles. Degrees from ENSTA Paris are accredited by the Conférence des Grandes Écoles and awarded by the Ministry of National Education (France). Alums go on to occupy elite positions within government, administration, and corporate firms in France.

Degrees 

Diplôme d'Ingénieur de l'ENSTA Paris (equivalent to a Master of Sciences in Engineering)
Master's degree in Nuclear Plant Design
Master's degree in Acoustical engineering
Master's degree in Maritime engineering : transport systems and offshore energies
Master's degree in Operational research
Master's degree in Analysis, modeling, simulation
Master's degree in Consulting in Organization, Strategy
Master's degree in Cyber-physical systems design
Master's degree in Processes, energy, environment
Mastère Spécialisé Maritime Engineering: transport, energy, sustainable development
Mastère Spécialisé Architecture and security of information systems
Mastère Spécialisé Design and Exploitation of Autonomous Maritime System
Mastère Spécialisé Project Manager in charging infrastructure and electric vehicles
Mastère Spécialisé Engineering of Localization Systems and Multi-Sensors

Notable alumni by field of contribution

Military and politics 

 Alain Bouquin, General Commander of the French Foreign Legion
 Eugène Deloncle
 Édouard Jean Baptiste Milhaud
Guillaume Delcourt

Engineering and industry 

Louis-Émile Bertin
Valérie Cornetet
Henri Dupuy de Lôme
Jacques-Noël Sané
Léonce Verny
Ernest Mercier, former President of Alstom
Jerome Guillen, President of Automotive at Tesla, Inc.
Fatim-Zahra Ammor Moroccan Minister

Chemistry 

 Paul Marie Eugène Vieille

Physics 

 Gérard Albert Mourou, Physics Nobel Prize 2018
François Forget, Astrophysicist and Member of the French Academy of Sciences

Mathematics 

Charles Dupin

References

External links
  ENSTA Paris

ParisTech
Engineering universities and colleges in France
Grandes écoles
Universities in Île-de-France
Educational institutions established in 1970
1970 establishments in France
Educational institutions established in 1741
1741 establishments in France